Wakapuaka is a small township lying to the north of Nelson, New Zealand. The road to Glenduan joins SH 6 at Wakapuaka.

Parks

Wakapuaka Sandflats Esplanade, a local public park area, is located in Wakapuaka.

Demographics
Wakapuaka is part of the Nelson Rural statistical area.

References

Suburbs of Nelson, New Zealand
Populated places in the Nelson Region
Populated places around Tasman Bay / Te Tai-o-Aorere